This article lists the results for the China PR national football team between 1990 and 2009.

1990

1992

1993

1994

1995

1996

1997

1998

2000

2001

2002

China played the non-FIFA Catalonia team on 28 December 2002; this did not contribute to ranking points or individual cap totals.

2003

2004

2005

2006

2007

2008

2009

References
China national football team fixtures and results FIFA.com
Team China official website

1990s in China
2000s in China
1990-2009